Emanuel Andrés Grespán (born 29 December 1998) is an Argentine professional footballer who plays as a forward for Ferro Carril Oeste.

Career
Grespán's career began in the system of Ferro Carril Oeste. He was an unused substitute once during the 2016–17 season in Primera B Nacional, as the club drew 0–0 with Almagro on 27 July 2017. In June 2018, Grespán was loaned to Primera B Metropolitana's Acassuso. He made his senior, professional debut on 8 September off the substitutes bench versus Atlanta, though didn't feature again until the succeeding February when he started a victory over Deportivo Español. He returned to Ferro in June 2020.

Career statistics
.

References

External links

1998 births
Living people
Place of birth missing (living people)
Argentine footballers
Association football forwards
Primera B Metropolitana players
Ferro Carril Oeste footballers
Club Atlético Acassuso footballers